Szob is a town in Pest county, Central Hungary, Hungary. It is just south and east of the Slovak border on the north bank of the Danube.

Szob is on a major electrified rail connection from Bratislava and a major railway border crossing into Hungary. The border is located between Szob and Štúrovo. On 21 December 2007, all border controls ceased as Hungary and Slovakia became part of the Schengen Area.

Szob is known to Americans for its forced-labor camp which held former US Congressman Tom Lantos, during much of World War II.

List of Notable people from Szob
 Gábor Demjén (1986 - ), footballer for Abahani Limited.
 László Antal (1930 - 1993), linguist.
 Gudbrand Gregersen de Saág (1824 – 24 December 1910), Norwegian-born Norwegian-Hungarian bridge engineer.

Gallery

References

External links

  in Hungarian
 Street map 

Populated places in Pest County
Hungary–Slovakia border crossings